Sand Hill is an unincorporated community in Rankin County, Mississippi, United States.

Sand Hill is the birthplace of 3x US Olympic Medalist Tori Bowie. Bowie won a gold medal in the 4x100m relay, Silver medal in the 100m dash, and bronze in the 200m dash at the 2016 Rio Olympics in Rio de Janeiro, Brazil. She also won gold in the Women's 100 metres at the 2017 World Championships in London.

References

Unincorporated communities in Rankin County, Mississippi
Unincorporated communities in Mississippi